Yassin Hamzah (born 27 September 1990) is a Saudi Arabian footballer who plays as a defender for Al-Ain. He is a former  Saudi Arabia international, having made his last appearance in 2015.

Honours
Al-Ittihad
King Cup: 2018
Crown Prince Cup: 2016–17

References

External links
 

Living people
1990 births
Saudi Arabian footballers
Saudi Arabia international footballers
Association football defenders
Al-Taawoun FC players
Ittihad FC players
Al-Fateh SC players
Al-Wehda Club (Mecca) players
Ohod Club players
Al-Ain FC (Saudi Arabia) players
Saudi Professional League players
Saudi First Division League players
Saudi Arabian Shia Muslims